Christopher New is an English academic, author and philosopher.

In 1969, New became the head of the philosophy department at The University of Hong Kong. He is the author of the historical novel series, The China Coast Trilogy, which deals with the British presence in China during the 20th century. New has also written novels set in India, Egypt and Europe. He currently divides his time between Asia and Europe.


Bibliography

China Coast Trilogy

Other novels
 "The Kaminsky Cure", Saqi. 2005.  
 "The Road to Maridur", Asia2000. 2002.  
 "A Small Place in the Desert", Asia2000. 2004. 
 "Goodbye Chairman Mao", New English Library. 1980. 
 Gage Street Courtesan, Earnshaw Books. 2013.

Philosophy
Book
 The Philosophy of Literature: An Introduction, Routledge. 1999.  
Journals

External links
Asia2000: Review of "Shanghai"
Asia2000: Christopher New

Living people
Philosophy academics
Academic staff of the University of Hong Kong
Writers of historical fiction set in the modern age
English historical novelists
Year of birth missing (living people)